KTS/Kts may refer to:
 Keirsey Temperament Sorter, a self-assessed personality questionnaire
 Key telephone system
 Klippel–Trénaunay syndrome in medicine
 Knight of the Military Order of the Tower and Sword of Portugal
 The Knights Templar School, a secondary school in Baldock, Hertfordshire, England
 Knot (unit), a unit of speed equal to one nautical mile per hour
 Brevig Mission Airport (IATA: KTS)
 Potassium thiosulfate
 Københavns Tekniske Skole, a school of secondary education in Copenhagen, Denmark
 Kagoshima Television, a Japanese commercial TV station